Bill Schickel is an Iowa broadcast executive.  A former Iowa State Representative, he represented the 13th District for three terms. He was elected to his fourth term as the mayor of Mason City, Iowa on November 7, 2017. He is the former the co-chairman of the Republican Party of Iowa. He was chairman of the 2012 Iowa Caucus Review Committee.

During his service in the Iowa House, Schickel served as a member of the Appropriations and Economic Growth committees and as the chair of the Ethics Committee and of the Economic Development Appropriations Committee.

He was a news anchor, producer, assignment editor, reporter and account executive for the CBS television affiliate, KIMT-TV, in Mason City, IA. He worked as an editor and reporter for The Globe-Gazette in Mason City and newspapers in Ohio.

He received his BA from the University of Cincinnati.

His wife, Candi, is a Mason City, IA, attorney. The Schickels have three adult daughters.

Electoral history
*incumbent

References

External links

Schickel on Project Vote Smart
Schickel's erstwhile Capitol Web Address
Facebook

Republican Party members of the Iowa House of Representatives
Living people
1951 births
University of Cincinnati alumni
People from Mason City, Iowa
Mayors of places in Iowa
American radio executives
People from Loveland, Ohio